The 2016–17 Sacramento Kings season was the 72nd season of the franchise, its 68th season in the National Basketball Association (NBA), and its 32nd in Sacramento. It was their first season at Golden 1 Center. On May 10, 2016, the Kings hired Dave Joerger as their new head coach.

Draft picks

Roster

Standings

Division

Conference

Game log

Pre-season

|- style="background:#fbb;"
| 1
| October 4
| @ L.A. Lakers
| 
| Arron Afflalo (14)
| DeMarcus Cousins (6)
| DeMarcus Cousins (4)
| Honda Center (Anaheim)9,187
| 0–1
|- style="background:#fbb;"
| 2
| October 6
| @ Golden State
| 
| DeMarcus Cousins (20)
| Matt Barnes (8)
| Matt Barnes (4)
| SAP Center18,234
| 0–2
|- style="background:#cfc;"
| 3
| October 10
| Maccabi Haifa
| 
| Ben McLemore (18)
| Ty Lawson (7)
| Ty Lawson (8)
| Golden 1 Center16,000
| 1–2
|- style="background:#cfc;"
| 4
| October 13
| @ L.A. Lakers
| 
| Anthony Tolliver (21)
| Rudy Gay (9)
| Collison, Gay (7)
| T-Mobile Arena (Las Vegas)8,905
| 2–2
|- style="background:#cfc;"
| 5
| October 15
| Washington
| 
| Collison, Cousins (22)
| Cousins, Cauley-Stein, Tolliver (22)
| Darren Collison (8)
| Rupp Arena (Lexington)8,472
| 3–2
|- style="background:#fbb;"
| 6
| October 18
| @ L.A. Clippers
| 
| DeMarcus Cousins (23)
| Cousins, Cauley-Stein (8)
| Ben McLemore (5)
| Golden 1 Center16,000
| 3–3

Regular season

|- style="background:#cfc;"
| 1
| October 26
| @ Phoenix
| 
| DeMarcus Cousins (24)
| Matt Barnes (7)
| Ty Lawson (7)
| Talking Stick Resort Arena18,055
| 1–0
|- style="background:#fcc;"
| 2
| October 27
| San Antonio
| 
| DeMarcus Cousins (37)
| DeMarcus Cousins (16)
| Ty Lawson (9)
| Golden 1 Center17,608
| 1–1
|- style="background:#cfc;"
| 3
| October 29
| Minnesota
| 
| DeMarcus Cousins (29)
| Kosta Koufos (8)
| Matt Barnes (9)
| Golden 1 Center17,608
| 2–1
|- style="background:#fcc;"
| 4
| October 31
| @ Atlanta
| 
| Rudy Gay (22)
| DeMarcus Cousins (12)
| Ty Lawson (6)
| Philips Arena12,501
| 2–2

|- style="background:#fcc"
| 5
| November 1
| @ Miami
| 
| Gay, Cousins (30)
| Rudy Gay (12)
| Lawson, Cousins (4)
| American Airlines Arena19,612
| 2–3
|- style="background:#fcc"
| 6
| November 3
| @ Orlando
| 
| DeMarcus Cousins (33)
| Lawson, Koufos, Cousins (7)
| Ty Lawson (4)
| Amway Center17,026
| 2–4
|- style="background:#fcc"
| 7
| November 5
| @ Milwaukee
| 
| Garrett Temple (19)
| Kosta Koufos (7)
| Jordan Farmar (7)
| BMO Harris Bradley Center16,021
| 2–5
|- style="background:#cfc;"
| 8
| November 6
| @ Toronto
| 
| DeMarcus Cousins (22)
| DeMarcus Cousins (14)
| Ty Lawson (11)
| Air Canada Centre19,800
| 3–5
|- style="background:#cfc"
| 9
| November 8
| New Orleans
| 
| DeMarcus Cousins (28)
| Matt Barnes (8)
| Rudy Gay (6)
| Golden 1 Center17,608
| 4−5
|- style="background:#fcc"
| 10
| November 10
| L.A. Lakers
| 
| DeMarcus Cousins (28)
| DeMarcus Cousins (9)
| Darren Collison (9)
| Golden 1 Center17,608
| 4−6
|- style="background:#fcc"
| 11
| November 11
| @ Portland
| 
| DeMarcus Cousins (33)
| Rudy Gay (14)
| Lawson, Collison (4)
| Moda Center19,918
| 4−7
|- style="background:#fcc"
| 12
| November 16
| San Antonio
| 
| DeMarcus Cousins (26)
| DeMarcus Cousins (17)
| Cousins, Collison (6)
| Golden 1 Center17,608
| 4–8
|- style="background:#fcc"
| 13
| November 18
| L.A. Clippers
| 
| DeMarcus Cousins (38)
| DeMarcus Cousins (13)
| Ty Lawson (8)
| Golden 1 Center17,608
| 4−9
|- style="background:#cfc"
| 14
| November 20
| Toronto
| 
| Rudy Gay (23)
| DeMarcus Cousins (10)
| Darren Collison (9)
| Golden 1 Center17,608
| 5−9
|- style="background:#cfc"
| 15
| November 23
| Oklahoma City
| 
| DeMarcus Cousins (36)
| DeMarcus Cousins (13)
| Darren Collison (6)
| Golden 1 Center17,608
| 6−9
|- style="background:#fcc"
| 16
| November 25
| Houston
| 
| DeMarcus Cousins (32)
| DeMarcus Cousins (9)
| Afflalo, Casspi (5)
| Golden 1 Center17,608
| 6−10
|- style="background:#cfc"
| 17
| November 27
| @ Brooklyn
| 
| DeMarcus Cousins (37)
| DeMarcus Cousins (11)
| Rudy Gay (8)
| Barclays Center13,646
| 7−10
|- style="background:#fcc"
| 18
| November 28
| @ Washington
| 
| DeMarcus Cousins (36)
| DeMarcus Cousins (20)
| DeMarcus Cousins (4)
| Verizon Center12,571
| 7−11

|- style="background:#fcc"
| 19
| December 2
| @ Boston
| 
| DeMarcus Cousins (28)
| Matt Barnes (16)
| Matt Barnes (5)
| TD Garden18,624
| 7−12
|-style="background:#fcc"
| 20
| December 4
| @ New York
| 
| DeMarcus Cousins (36)
| DeMarcus Cousins (12)
| Darren Collison (6)
| Madison Square Garden19,812
| 7–13
|-style="background:#cfc"
| 21
| December 7
| @ Dallas
| 
| DeMarcus Cousins (24)
| DeMarcus Cousins (14)
| DeMarcus Cousins (7)
| American Airlines Center19,711
| 8–13
|- style="background:#fcc"
| 22
| December 9
| New York
| 
| DeMarcus Cousins (28)
| DeMarcus Cousins (12)
| Cousins, Lawson (6)
| Golden 1 Center17,608
| 8−14
|- style="background:#fcc"
| 23
| December 10
| @ Utah
| 
| Rudy Gay (20)
| DeMarcus Cousins (10)
| Cousins, Lawson (4)
| Vivint Smart Home Arena19,331
| 8−15
|- style="background:#cfc"
| 24
| December 12
| L. A. Lakers
| 
| DeMarcus Cousins (31)
| DeMarcus Cousins (16)
| Cousins, Lawson (5)
| Golden 1 Center17,608
| 9–15
|- style="background:#fcc;"
| 25
| December 14
| @ Houston
| 
| Garrett Temple (20)
| Anthony Tolliver (10)
| Darren Collison (9)
| Toyota Center15,039
| 9–16
|- style="background:#cfc;"
| 26
| December 16
| @ Memphis
| 
| DeMarcus Cousins (22)
| Kosta Koufos (13)
| Darren Collison (9)
| FedExForum15,987
| 10–16
|- style="background:#fcc;"
| 27
| December 18
| @ Dallas
| 
| DeMarcus Cousins (33)
| Kosta Koufos (9)
| Garrett Temple (7)
| American Airlines Center19,504
| 10–17
|- style="background:#cfc;"
| 28
| December 20
| Portland
| 
| DeMarcus Cousins (55)
| DeMarcus Cousins (13)
| Ty Lawson (8)
| Golden 1 Center17,608
| 11–17
|- style="background:#cfc;"
| 29
| December 21
| @ Utah
| 
| DeMarcus Cousins (21)
| DeMarcus Cousins (8)
| Afflalo, Cousins (3)
| American Airlines Center19,504
| 12–17
|- style="background:#cfc;"
| 30
| December 23
| @ Minnesota
| 
| DeMarcus Cousins (32)
| DeMarcus Cousins (7)
| DeMarcus Cousins (7)
| Target Center13,288
| 13–17
|- style="background:#cfc"
| 31
| December 26
| Philadelphia
| 
| DeMarcus Cousins (30)
| Rudy Gay (9)
| DeMarcus Cousins (5)
| Golden 1 Center 17,608
| 14–17
|- style="background:#fcc"
| 32
| December 28
| @ Portland
| 
| DeMarcus Cousins (28)
| Kosta Koufos (10)
| DeMarcus Cousins (6)
| Moda Center 19,665
| 14–18
|- style="background:#fcc"
| 33
| December 31
| Memphis
| 
| DeMarcus Cousins (26)
| Koufos, Barnes (8)
| DeMarcus Cousins (8)
| Golden 1 Center 17,608
| 14–19

|- style="background:#cfc"
| 34
| January 3
| @ Denver
| 
| DeMarcus Cousins (31)
| Cousins, Temple (6)
| Darren Collison (9)
| Pepsi Center11,018
| 15–19
|- style="background:#fcc"
| 35
| January 4
| Miami
| 
| Afflalo, Temple, Lawson (15)
| Matt Barnes (7)
| Ty Lawson (6)
| Golden 1 Center17,608
| 15–20
|- style="background:#fcc"
| 36
| January 6
| LA Clippers
| 
| DeMarcus Cousins (25)
| DeMarcus Cousins (11)
| DeMarcus Cousins (7)
| Golden 1 Center17,608
| 15–21
|- style="background:#fcc"
| 37
| January 8
| Golden State
| 
| Rudy Gay (23)
| DeMarcus Cousins (10)
| DeMarcus Cousins (5)
| Golden 1 Center17,608
| 15−22
|- style="background:#cfc"
| 38
| January 10
| Detroit
| 
| DeMarcus Cousins (24)
| DeMarcus Cousins (13)
| DeMarcus Cousins (6)
| Golden 1 Center17,608
| 16−22
|- style= "background:#fcc;"
| 39
| January 13
| Cleveland
| 
| DeMarcus Cousins (26)
| Rudy Gay (10)
| DeMarcus Cousins (11)
| Golden 1 Center17,608
| 16-23
|- style= "background:#fcc;"
| 40
| January 15
| Oklahoma City
| 
| DeMarcus Cousins (31)
| DeMarcus Cousins (11)
| DeMarcus Cousins (7)
| Golden 1 Center17,608
| 16–24
|- style= "background:#fcc;"
| 41
| January 18
| Indiana
| 
| DeMarcus Cousins (25)
| DeMarcus Cousins (12)
| DeMarcus Cousins (10)
| Golden 1 Center17,608
| 16–25
|- style= "background:#fcc;"
| 42
| January 20
| @ Memphis
| 
| DeMarcus Cousins (19)
| DeMarcus Cousins (10)
| Ty Lawson (5)
| FedExForum16,991
| 16–26
|- style="background:#fcc;"
| 43
| January 21
| @ Chicago
| 
| DeMarcus Cousins (42)
| DeMarcus Cousins (14)
| Ty Lawson (6)
| United Center21,606
| 16–27
|- style="background:#cfc;"
| 44
| January 23
| @ Detroit
| 
| DeMarcus Cousins (22)
| DeMarcus Cousins (14)
| Cousins, Lawson (6)
| The Palace of Auburn Hills14,017
| 17–27
|- style="background:#cfc"
| 45
| January 25
| @ Cleveland
| 
| DeMarcus Cousins (28)
| DeMarcus Cousins (11)
| DeMarcus Cousins (9)
| Quicken Loans Arena20,562
| 18–27
|- style="background:#fcc;"
| 46
| January 27
| @ Indiana
| 
| Cousins, Collison (26)
| DeMarcus Cousins (16)
| Cousins, Collison (5)
| Bankers Life Fieldhouse17,522
| 18–28
|-style="background:#cfc;"
| 47
| January 28
| @ Charlotte
| 
| DeMarcus Cousins (35)
| DeMarcus Cousins (18)
| Ty Lawson (9)
| Spectrum Center18,597
| 19–28
|- style="background:#fcc;"
| 48
| January 30
| @ Philadelphia
| 
| DeMarcus Cousins (46)
| DeMarcus Cousins (15)
| Ty Lawson (11)
| Wells Fargo Center15,840
| 19–29
|- style="background:#fcc;"
| 49
| January 31
| @ Houston
| 
| DeMarcus Cousins (16)
| Matt Barnes (11)
| DeMarcus Cousins (5)
| Toyota Center15,182
| 19–30

|- style="background:#fcc;"
| 50
| February 3
| Phoenix
| 
| DeMarcus Cousins (22)
| DeMarcus Cousins (12)
| DeMarcus Cousins (12)
| Golden 1 Center17,608
| 19–31
|- style="background:#cfc;"
| 51
| February 4
| Golden State
| 
| DeMarcus Cousins (32)
| Matt Barnes (14)
| DeMarcus Cousins (9)
| Golden 1 Center17,608
| 20–31
|- style="background:#fcc;"
| 52
| February 6
| Chicago
| 
| DeMarcus Cousins (18)
| DeMarcus Cousins (14)
| Ty Lawson (7)
| Golden 1 Center17,608
| 20–32
|- style="background:#cfc;"
| 53
| February 8
| Boston
| 
| Darren Collison (26)
| Kosta Koufos (11)
| Darren Collison (5)
| Golden 1 Center17,608
| 21–32
|- style="background:#cfc;"
| 54
| February 10
| Atlanta
| 
| DeMarcus Cousins (22)
| DeMarcus Cousins (11)
| DeMarcus Cousins (7)
| Golden 1 Center 17,608
| 22–32
|- style="background:#cfc;"
| 55
| February 12
| New Orleans
| 
| DeMarcus Cousins (28)
| DeMarcus Cousins (14)
| Darren Collison (8)
| Golden 1 Center17,608
| 23–32
|- style="background:#cfc;"
| 56
| February 14
| @ L. A. Lakers
| 
| DeMarcus Cousins (40)
| DeMarcus Cousins (12)
| Cousins, Collison (8)
| STAPLES Center19,997
| 24–32
|- style="background:#fcc;"
| 57
| February 15
| @ Golden State
| 
| Matt Barnes (15)
| Matt Barnes (14)
| DeMarcus Cousins (6)
| Oracle Arena19,596
| 24–33
|- style="background:#cfc;"
| 58
| February 23
| Denver
| 
| Willie Cauley-Stein (29)
| Willie Cauley-Stein (10)
| Darren Collison (10)
| Golden 1 Center 17,608
| 25–33
|-style="background:#fcc;"
| 59
| February 25
| Charlotte
| 
| Ben McLemore (18)
| Skal Labissiere (13)
| Collison, Evans (5)
| Golden 1 Center17,608
| 25–34
|-style="background:#fcc;"
| 60
| February 27
| Minnesota
| 
| McLemore, Cauley-Stein (14)
| Kosta Koufos (11)
| Ty Lawson (9)
| Golden 1 Center17,608
| 25–35

|-style="background:#fcc;"
| 61
| March 1
| Brooklyn
| 
| Buddy Hield (16)
| Anthony Tolliver (6)
| Ty Lawson (9)
| Golden 1 Center17,608
| 25–36
|-style="background:#fcc;"
| 62
| March 5
| Utah
| 
| Ty Lawson (19)
| Kosta Koufos (10)
| Collison, Lawson (5)
| Golden 1 Center17,608
| 25–37
|- style="background:#fcc;"
| 63
| March 6
| @ Denver
| 
| Darren Collison (17)
| Kosta Koufos (10)
| Ty Lawson (6)
| Pepsi Center11,614
| 25–38
|- style="background:#fcc;"
| 64
| March 8
| @ San Antonio
| 
| Tyreke Evans (26)
| Kosta Koufos (10)
| Evans, Collison (4)
| AT&T Center18,418
| 25–39
|- style="background:#fcc;"
| 65
| March 10
| Washington
| 
| Willie Cauley-Stein (20)
| Willie Cauley-Stein (13)
| Darren Collison (10)
| Golden 1 Center17,608
| 25–40
|- style="background:#fcc;"
| 66
| March 11
| Denver
| 
| Buddy Hield (17)
| Kosta Koufos (10)
| Cauley-Stein, Collison (5)
| Golden 1 Center17,608
| 25–41
|- style="background:#cfc;"
| 67
| March 13
| Orlando
| 
| Darren Collison (19)
| Cauley-Stein, Labissiere (7)
| Darren Collison (13)
| Golden 1 Center17,608
| 26–41
|- style="background:#cfc;"
| 68
| March 15
| @ Phoenix
| 
| Skal Labissiere (32)
| Cauley-Stein, Labissiere (11)
| Ty Lawson (6)
| Talking Stick Resort Arena17,196
| 27–41
|- style="background:#fcc;"
| 69
| March 18
| @ Oklahoma City
| 
| Georgios Papagiannis (14)
| Georgios Papagiannis (11)
| Ty Lawson (6)
| Chesapeake Energy Arena18,203
| 27–42
|- style="background:#fcc;"
| 70
| March 19
| @ San Antonio
| 
| Hield, Cauley-Stein (18)
| Georgios Papagiannis (10)
| Ty Lawson (6)
| AT&T Center18,418
| 27–43
|- style="background:#fcc;"
| 71
| March 22
| Milwaukee
| 
| Buddy Hield (21)
| Skal Labissiere (8)
| Darren Collison (7)
| Golden 1 Center17,608
| 27–44
|- style="background:#fcc;"
| 72
| March 24
| @ Golden State
| 
| Buddy Hield (22)
| Skal Labissiere (10)
| Skal Labissiere (8)
| Oracle Arena19,596
| 27−45
|- style="background:#cfc;"
| 73
| March 26
| @ L. A. Clippers
| 
| Darren Collison (19)
| Willie Cauley-Stein (14)
| Garrett Temple (5)
| Staples Center19,060
| 28−45
|- style="background:#cfc;"
| 74
| March 27
| Memphis
| 
| Darren Collison (23)
| Willie Cauley-Stein (9)
| Darren Collison (7)
| Golden 1 Center17,608
| 29–45
|- style="background:#fcc;"
| 75
| March 29
| Utah
| 
| Ben McLemore (22)
| Willie Cauley-Stein (8)
| Ty Lawson (3)
| Golden 1 Center17,608
| 29–46
|- style="background:#fcc;"
| 76
| March 31
| @ New Orleans
| 
| Ben McLemore (15)
| Willie Cauley-Stein (14)
| Darren Collison (5)
| Smoothie King Center17,304
| 29–47

|- style="background:#cfc;"
| 77
| April 1
| @ Minnesota
| 
| Buddy Hield (22)
| Willie Cauley-Stein (10)
| Ty Lawson (11)
| Target Center18,960
| 30–47
|- style="background:#cfc;"
| 78
| April 4
| Dallas
| 
| Ben McLemore (22)
| Willie Cauley-Stein (16)
| Evans, Temple (5)
| Golden 1 Center17,608
| 31–47
|- style="background:#fcc;"
| 79
| April 7
| @ L. A. Lakers
| 
| Skal Labissiere (19)
| Georgios Papagiannis (10)
| Darren Collison (10)
| Staples Center18,997
| 31–48
|- style="background:#fcc;"
| 80
| April 9
| Houston
| 
| Skal Labissiere (25)
| Willie Cauley-Stein (10)
| Ty Lawson (11)
| Golden 1 Center17,608
| 31–49
|- style="background:#cfc;"
| 81
| April 11
| Phoenix
| 
| Buddy Hield (30)
| Ty Lawson (11)
| Ty Lawson (12)
| Golden 1 Center17,608
| 32–49
|- style=background:#fcc;"
| 82
| April 12
| @ L. A. Clippers
| 
| Willie Cauley-Stein (19)
| Willie Cauley-Stein (14)
| Afflalo, Galloway, Cauley-Stein (6)
| Staples Center19,060
| 32–50

Transactions

Trades

Free agency

Additions

Subtractions

References

Sacramento Kings seasons
Sacramento Kings
Sacramento Kings
Sacramento Kings